Iván Ramírez may refer to:
Iván Ramírez (footballer, born 1990), Argentine footballer
Iván Ramírez (footballer, born 1994), Paraguayan footballer